Anthology is a three-CD boxed set of recordings from pop punk band Generation X. Released in 2003, it features a selection of tracks from the band's three studio albums, the band's abortive third studio album, entitled Sweet Revenge, and a 1979 live recording from Osaka, Japan. Also featured are several studio rarities, alternate mixes, and an interview recorded with bassist Tony James.

Track listing

Disc 1

Disc 2 - Sweet Revenge

Disc 3 - Live in Osaka 1979

References 

Generation X (band) albums
2003 compilation albums
EMI Records compilation albums